The European Training Foundation (ETF) is an agency of the European Union.  Established in 1990, operational since 1994, the European Training Foundation is located in Turin, Italy.

The ETF helps improve vocational training systems in non-EU countries, mostly in neighbouring regions such as the countries preparing for EU accession, North Africa, the Middle East, the Balkans and the former Soviet Union.

The ETF offers these countries insight, know-how and experience in training people for new jobs and in developing lifelong learning programmes.

It cooperates closely with its sister agency, the European Centre for the Development of Vocational Training (Cedefop), which has a mandate on vocational training within the EU member states. 

It counts approximately 130 staff, representing most EU member states and some of the ETF non-EU partner countries. Its first director was Peter de Rooij, Dutch (1994-2004), followed by Muriel Dunbar, British (2004-2009) and Madlen Serban, Romanian (2009-2017). From 1 September 2017 to 15 February 2021 the ETF's Director was Cesare Onestini, Italian. From 16 February 2022 Xavier Matheu, Spanish, has been appointed Director ad interim.

External links
European Training Foundation
https://ec.europa.eu/info/departments/employment-social-affairs-and-inclusion_en Description of the ETF on the EU website]

References

1990 in the European Economic Community
Agencies of the European Union
Government agencies established in 1990
Organisations based in Turin
Vocational education in Europe